Pagilšys is a village in Varėna District Municipality, in Alytus County, in southeastern Lithuania.The village had a population of 11 people according to the 2001 census and 6 people according to the 2011 census.

References

Villages in Alytus County
Varėna District Municipality